The Merkur or Großer Staufenberg is a mountain, in the Northern Black Forest, Baden-Württemberg, Germany. It is the Hausberg of Baden-Baden and located between the spa town and the town of Gernsbach.

Name 
The mountain is named after the Ancient Roman god of trade and commerce, Mercury, to whom a Roman votive stone on the summit is dedicated. The Merkurstein has been recorded since the 16th century. Today, there is a cast of the original votive stone on the summit plateau; its prototype is in the Baden-Baden Municipal Museum collection. The original name of the free-standing conical mountain was the Großer Staufenberg, a reference to the shape of a turned drinking mug known as a Stauf.

Funicular 
The summit of the Merkur is only accessible on foot, by bicycle or on the Merkur Funicular Railway (the Merkurbergbahn) from Baden-Baden. There are good views of Baden-Baden during the ascent.

Attractions 
At the top station is a restaurant. Other attractions at the summit include a sunbathing lawn, a barbecue area and a play park with giant slide. Aimed at spa guests, but usable by anyone, are the so-called "terrain spa walks" (Terrainkurwege) of different lengths and gradients. One of these paths leads to the wildlife park at the foot of the mountain where there are red deer, fallow deer and mounflon. About half-way up the Merkur on the Baden-Baden side is the premium footpath, the Panorama Way (Panoramaweg). The summit of the Merkur is a waystop on two other premium footpaths: the Gernsbacher Runde and Murgleiter.

Observation tower 

It was built in 1837 and was raised in height when the funicular was built. Since the 1950s it has also acted as a radio broadcast transmitter.

Panorama 
The mountain has an all-round view, not just over the bowl of Baden-Baden, the highest peaks of the Northern Black Forest and the Murg valley with the towns of Gaggenau and Gernsbach, but also of the Upper Rhine Plain, the Vosges, the Haardt and the Odenwald. In the field of view are the ruins of Hohenbaden Castle, the Battert rocks, the ruins of Alt Eberstein, the Fremersberg, the Yburg, the Badener Höhe and the Hornisgrinde as well as the cities of Karlsruhe and Strasbourg.

In literature
The mountain is the setting for the short story Mercury by D. H. Lawrence, first published in the Atlantic Monthly in 1927.

References

Mountains and hills of Baden-Württemberg
Baden-Baden
Tourist attractions in Baden-Württemberg
Mountains and hills of the Black Forest